The 2018 season of PSM Makassar.

Players

Current squad

Out on loan

References

External links
 

PSM
PSM Makassar